Purgatorio may refer to:
 Purgatorio, the second part of Dante's Divine Comedy
 Purgatorio (album), 2004 Tangerine Dream album
 Purgatorio (Avella), frazione of Avella, Italy
 The third movement of Gustav Mahler's Symphony No. 10 (Mahler), left incomplete at the time of his death.